Portage Lake may refer to:

Communities in the United States
 Portage Lake, Maine
 Portage Lakes, Ohio

Lakes in the United States
 Portage Lake (Alaska)
 Portage Lake (Maine)
 Portage Lake (Keweenaw), in the Keweenaw Peninsula of Michigan
 Portage Lake (Michigan), in Manistee County, Michigan
 Portage Lake (Aitkin County, Minnesota)
 Portage Lake (Hubbard County, Minnesota)
 Portage Lake (Otter Tail County, Minnesota)
 Portage Lake County Park, in Jackson County, Michigan
 Portage Lakes, a group of lakes in Ohio
 Lake Margrethe in Crawford County, Michigan, formerly known as Portage Lake